Breathe Carolina is an American electronic dance music duo, formed in Denver, Colorado, in 2007. They have released five studio albums, nine extended plays and 61 singles. Their debut album, It's Classy, Not Classic was released on September 16, 2008 and peaked at No. 186 on the Billboard 200. Their second studio album, Hello Fascination was released on August 18, 2009 and peaked at No. 43 on the Billboard 200. Their third studio album, Hell Is What You Make It was released on July 12, 2011 and peaked at No. 42 selling 64,000 copies to date. Their fourth studio album, Savages was released on April 15, 2014 and peaked at No. 22 on the Billboard 200. Their fifth studio album, Deadthealbum was released on November 15, 2019.

They released a cover of Jay Sean's "Down" for the Punk Goes Pop Volume 03. album. The song peaked at No. 31 on the Billboard Rock Digital Song Sales chart. Their breakout hit "Blackout" was released on June 14, 2011. The song peaked at No. 32 on the Billboard Hot 100 and is certified platinum in the US.

Albums

Studio albums

Extended plays

Mixtapes

Singles

Promotional singles

Music videos

Other appearances

Remixes

Notes

References

Discographies of American artists